Lovejoy is a studio album by Albert King, released in 1971.

The album peaked at No. 188 on the Billboard 200.

Production
The album was produced by Don Nix, who also penned some of the songs. "Lovejoy, Ill." is about Brooklyn, Illinois, which is nicknamed Lovejoy, after Elijah P. Lovejoy. King got his start in Lovejoy.

Track listing
"Honky Tonk Woman" (Mick Jagger, Keith Richards) – 3:59
"Bay Area Blues" (Donald "Duck" Dunn, Don Nix) – 2:55
"Corrina, Corrina" (Don Nix) – 3:45
"She Caught the Katy (And Left Me a Mule to Ride)" (Taj Mahal, James Rachell) – 3:56
"For the Love of a Woman" (Don Nix) – 4:20
"Lovejoy, III." (Don Nix) – 3:46
"Everybody Wants to Go to Heaven" (Don Nix) – 4:20
"Going Back to Iuka" (Don Nix) – 3:58
"Like a Road Leading Home" (Don Nix, Dan Penn) – 5:24

Personnel
 Albert King – electric guitar, vocals
 Jesse Ed Davis – guitar
 Tippy Armstrong – guitar
 Wayne Perkins – guitar
 John Gallie – keyboards
 Barry Beckett – keyboards
 Donald Dunn – bass guitar
 David Hood – bass guitar
 Jim Keltner – drums
 Roger Hawkins – drums
 Sandy Konikoff – percussion
 Jeanie Green – backing vocals
 The Mount Zion Singers – backing vocals
Technical
Larry Hamby, Marlin Greene, Peter Nicholls, Steve Smith - engineer
John Fry - remix engineer
Joel Brodsky - photography

References

1971 albums
Albert King albums
Stax Records albums
Albums produced by Don Nix
Albums recorded at Muscle Shoals Sound Studio